A series of Molotov cocktail arson attacks and shootings have taken place in Russian military commissariat registration and enlistment offices since the start of the country's invasion of Ukraine in 2022. Other governmental buildings have also been attacked in multiple regions of Russia. Part of the Russian partisan and anti-war movements, the attacks were spurred by several factors, including the outbreak of the invasion of Ukraine, the deployment of Russian conscripts to the front line, the start of spring conscription, and rumors about possible mobilization in the country, which were later found to be true. Commissariat offices recruit servicemen to the Russian Army and choose who is eligible and ineligible for service. The attacks are not a single coordinated campaign; behind them are a variety of people, from left-wing anarchists to far-right groups and assorted lone wolf actors.

Chronology

Versions 
In the Telegram channel “Oderint, Dum Metuant”, the authors of which opposed the invasion of Ukraine and position themselves as a cell of the revived National Socialism / White Power, there were videos of some actions - on some unknown people set fire to cars with the letter Z, on others fires are visible in some buildings — the channel claims that supporters of the movement set fire to the warehouse of the “military facility”, the police department and the military commissariats. The channel administrators even arranged a “quest”, promising 15,000 rubles to anyone who sets fire to a car with the Z symbol, or 30,000 for setting fire to a police car. They planned to pay money in cryptocurrency. According to the security officials, the movement's associates could be involved in several arsons in central Russia.

In anonymous Telegram channels and on pro-Kremlin websites, allegations began to appear that the Security Service of Ukraine pays 30,000 rubles for setting fire to military commissariats, and this “must be filmed on camera”.

According to another version, draft offices are set on fire by conscripts and those subject to possible mobilization.

Legal proceedings 
After beginning of mobilization, Vladimir Tsimlyansky, Representative of General Staff of the Armed Forces of the Russian Federation, in an interview with Rossiyskaya Gazeta stated "arson of military commissariat will be qualified as terrorist attack or calls for terrorist attack". According to Criminal Code of the Russian Federation, a person can get up to 15 years in prison for those charges. 

Two men — from Saint Peterburg and from Chernyakhovsk — were charged with "Intentional damage or destruction of someone else's property" under Arcticle 167. The man from Volgrad was arrested for molotov attack and is now detained on charges of Arcticle 167 as well as Article 213 "Hooliganism".

Another case has been opened under Article 205 "Terrorist act" for molotov attacker from Krasnodar.

See also
2022–2023 Russian mystery fires
2022 Western Russia attacks
2022 Belarusian and Russian partisan movement

References

2022 in Russia
2022 protests
Protests in Russia
Resistance during the 2022 Russian invasion of Ukraine